Tourmaline Surfing Park is a beach access point and a surf spot in North Pacific Beach, San Diego, California, USA. The park is situated at the northern end of Pacific Beach, a short distance south of where the sand beach ends and the rocky promontory of La Jolla begins. There are cliffs to the north and south of Tourmaline Surfing Park, but the park itself lies in Tourmaline Canyon, which cuts down through those cliffs to the beach.

Tourmaline Surfing Park is less than 1000 feet west of the point where Tourmaline Street crosses La Jolla Boulevard. Reaching the park involves a steep, palm-lined descent through Tourmaline Canyon to a fairly large parking lot, which is slightly elevated but situated right beside the beach. There are showers and restrooms, as well as railings and places to sit.

Tourmaline Memorial
Tourmaline Surfing Park also features "Tourmaline Memorial" a monument celebrating surfers who have enjoyed the surf at Tourmaline, in the past and the present, including Skeeter Malcolm.

Although surfers have surfed the area since the 1930s, Tourmaline Surfing Park first opened in May 1963; the idea for the memorial was conceived in 2006, and the memorial itself was completed in 2008. The motto is "Surf Well, Spread Aloha, Share Waves Without Judgment"

List of honorees
The list of honorees on the memorial is as follows:

Individual surfers
 Larry Gordon
 Floyd Smith
 Bobby "Challenger" Thomas
 Mike Hynson
 Skip Frye
 William " Hadji" Hein
 Emil Sigler
 Doc Paskowitz
 Woody Brown
 Don Okey
 Skeeter Malcolm
 Norm Polonski
 Ralph Dawson
 Doc Blankenship
 Bo Smith
 "Captain" Dan O'Connell
 Alexander "Bud" Caldwell
 Billie "Goldie" Goldsmith
 Ralph Barber
 Joe Gann
 Robert "Black mac" Mc Clendon
 Holly "Papa Smurf" Jones
 Ron St. John

Surfing clubs

 Kanakas Surf Club
 WindanSea Surf Club
 Pacific Beach Surf Club
 Tourmaline Tailgater's Surfing Association

See also
 List of beaches in San Diego County
 List of California state parks

References

Surfing locations in California
Tourmaline Surfing Park
Tourist attractions in San Diego
1963 establishments in California